Elton Wayne McGriff (August 21, 1942 – December 16, 2011) was an American professional basketball player. He played in the American Basketball Association for the Dallas Chaparrals, New Orleans Buccaneers, and Kentucky Colonels spanning the 1967–68 and 1968–69 seasons.

References

1942 births
2011 deaths
American men's basketball players
Basketball players from Texas
Centers (basketball)
City College of San Francisco Rams men's basketball players
Creighton Bluejays men's basketball players
Dallas Chaparrals players
Kentucky Colonels players
New Orleans Buccaneers players
People from Corsicana, Texas
St. Louis Hawks draft picks